Niki Tragano Football Club is a Greek football club, based in Tragano, Elis, Greece.

Honours

Domestic

 Elis FCA champion: 1
 2017-18
 Elis FCA Cup Winners: 1
 2013-14

References

Football clubs in Western Greece
Elis
Association football clubs established in 1980
1980 establishments in Greece
Gamma Ethniki clubs